Goa is a state in India, and a former Portuguese colonial possession, while the name was often used for the whole of Portuguese India.

 Goa or GOA may also refer to:

Places
 Goa, Botswana, a small town in Botswana, near the Namibian border, near the Caprivi Strip
 Goa, Camarines Sur,  a municipality in the Philippines
 Goah, Pakistan, a village in Punjab Pakistan
 Sultanate of Gowa, a kingdom in the South Sulawesi region of what is now Indonesia
 Goa-eup, a town in Gumi, North Gyeongsang, South Korea
 Goa, Burkina Faso
 Related to the state of Goa in India
 Goa, Daman and Diu, a short lived Indian Union Territory
 Ilhas de Goa (also known as Tiswadi), a sub-district within Goa
 Goa (island) (Ilha de Goa), an island in Nampula, Mozambique.
 Nova Goa (also known as Panjim or Panaji), the current capital of the state of Goa
 Velha Goa (also known as Old Goa), the former capital city of Portuguese India
 Goa Velha, a village on the island of Goa, which was once a suburb of the former capital

Abbreviations
 Gene ontology Annotation, the practice of capturing data about a gene product
 General of the army, a military rank used in some countries to denote a senior leader
 Genoa Cristoforo Colombo Airport located west of Genoa, Italy, by IATA code
 Government of Afghanistan, a country in central Asia
 Government of Alberta, a province in Canada
 Government of Australia, the federal government of the Commonwealth of Australia
 Grade of Automation (GoA) for trains
 Greek Orthodox Archdiocese of America
 Gun Owners of America, a gun rights organization in the United States 
 Rhein-Hunsrück-Kreis (for Sankt Goar, German vehicle registration plate code)

People with the surname
 Daniel Goa (born 1953), New Caledonian politician
 Trygve Goa (1925–2013), Norwegian printmaker

Film
 Goa (2010 film), a Tamil film directed by Venkat Prabhu
 Goa (soundtrack)
 Goa (2015 film), a Kannada film directed by Surya

Music
 "Goa", a track from the Frank Zappa album Guitar
 Goa trance, a form of electronic music that originated during the late 1980s in Goa, India
 Go A, a music band that represented Ukraine at the Eurovision Song Contest 2021

Nature
 Goa (antelope), also known as the Tibetan Gazelle, a species of antelope in and around Tibet
 Goa bean, another name for the winged bean

Other uses
 Goa, a board game by Rüdiger Dorn
 Goa, the gaming division of Orange/France Telecom
 Goa, name of the Mahindra Scorpio SUV in Italy
 S-125 Neva/Pechora, a Soviet surface-to-air missile system with NATO reporting name SA-3 Goa

See also

 
 
 
 
 
 
 
 Goas (disambiguation)
 Gao (disambiguation)